The Pueyrredón/Cochrane Lake is a glacier fed lake located on the eastern edge of the southern Andes, straddling the border between Argentina and Chile. It is named after Lord Cochrane on the Chilean side and Juan Martín de Pueyrredón on the Argentina side. The border is a peninsula that juts out into the lake on the north side. The border to the north of the lake follows the ridgeline of the last major expression of the eastern Andes.

A narrow land bridge separates the southern end of Lake Pueyrredón from the smaller, shallower Lake Posadas. Its drainage basin is bordered by the Ghio Lake basin to the northeast. Cochrane Lake drains into the Baker River through the short  Cochrane River on its western edge. The 12,156 foot (3,706 meter) high Monte San Lorenzo has a small stream named Oro River, originating on its north flank that flows generally northeastward into Lake Pueyrredón. The vast semi-arid Patagonian Plateau lies east of the lake. The Ecker River and the Blanco River cut canyons across the plateau. The former is the main tributary of the Pinturas River.

The town of Cochrane and the Lago Cochrane National Reserve are located in the vicinity of the lake.

A bathymetric survey of the lake was carried out between December 1996 and February 1997, using an Echo Sounder with GPS navigation. The results showed that the central basin of the lake reaches a depth of 460m (1,509 ft). This deep central basin is separated by a shallow sill from a series of small deep basins of just over 200 metres depth, which comprise the western end of the lake.

References

External links

Image Science and Analysis Laboratory, NASA-Johnson Space Center. 18 Mar. 2005. "Earth from Space - Image Information." NM23-722-000B Lakes Pueyrredon and Ghio (11 Jan. 2007).

Pueyrredon Lake
Cochrane Lake
Lakes of Aysén Region
Lakes
Argentina–Chile border
International lakes of South America